The 1832 United States presidential election in Ohio took place between November 2 and December 5, 1832, as part of the 1832 United States presidential election. Voters chose 21 representatives, or electors to the Electoral College, who voted for President and Vice President.

Ohio voted for the Democratic Party candidate, Andrew Jackson, over the National Republican candidate, Henry Clay, and the Anti-Masonic Party candidate, William Wirt. Jackson won Ohio by a narrow margin of 2.98%.

Results

See also
 United States presidential elections in Ohio

References

Ohio
1832
1832 Ohio elections